Corneometry is a widely practiced method for the measurement of skin hydration. It uses a capacitive sensor to measure the relative permittivity of upper skin layers. Because these depend on hydration of skin, the measured value is a measure for skin hydration.

The name corneometry is derived from the German trademark Corneometer. In 1979 the first commercial instrument for measuring skin hydration was sold under this name.

Literature 

Skin physiology
Skin tests